Andre "Dries" van der Lof (23 August 1919 in Emmen – 24 May 1990 in Enschede) was a racing driver from the Netherlands. Van der Lof was an industrialist whose factory manufactured electric cable, and competed as an amateur in motorsport events. He participated in one World Championship Grand Prix, the 1952 Dutch Grand Prix on 17 August 1952, where together with Jan Flinterman he was the first driver from the Netherlands to compete in a Formula One World Championship race. Entering an HWM 52, he retired from the race after 70 laps and scored no championship points. He later bought a Maserati 250F and competed in historic racing until the 1980s.

Complete World Championship Grand Prix results
(key)

References 

1919 births
1990 deaths
Sportspeople from Emmen, Netherlands
Dutch racing drivers
Dutch Formula One drivers
Hersham and Walton Motors Formula One drivers